Stevensville is an unincorporated community in Stevens Township, Bradford County, Pennsylvania, United States.

Notable people
Cyrus Avery (1871-1963), businessman, was born in Stevensville.
William Thomas Grant (1876-1972), businessman, was born in Stevensville.

Notes

Unincorporated communities in Bradford County, Pennsylvania
Unincorporated communities in Pennsylvania